Eugenia klotzschiana, or cerrado pear, is a species of plant in the family Myrtaceae. It is found in Brazil. The shrub produces fruit that are eaten.

References

External links
 
 

Flora of Brazil
klotzschiana